Hoshang Amroliwala (12 August 1931 – 29 December 2017) was an Indian cricketer. He played 44 first-class matches for Mumbai between 1956 and 1964. He was the first cricketer to take a five-wicket haul in the Irani Cup and played in five finals of the Ranji Trophy. He also represented the Parsi Cyclists club in the Kanga League A Division in the 1950s and 1960s.

See also
 List of Mumbai cricketers

References

External links
 

1931 births
2017 deaths
Indian cricketers
Mumbai cricketers

Parsi people